Erigeron purpurascens is a Chinese species of flowering plants in the family Asteraceae. It grows on mountainsides in the province of Sichuan in southwestern China.

Erigeron purpurascens is a tiny, clump-forming perennial herb rarely more than 7 cm (2.8 inches) tall, forming a woody rhizomes. Its flower heads have purple ray florets surrounding yellow disc florets.

References

purpurascens
Flora of Sichuan
Plants described in 1973